Richardson Log Cabin is a historic building that was built in 1902 (or 1903), by George H. Richardson, an Alameda attorney. The structure is recognized as significant as one of the oldest residential buildings in Carmel-by-the-Sea, California and the earliest known residence of American poet Robinson Jeffers and his wife Una. It was nominated by the Carmel City Council and a historical building and an application was submitted to the California Register of Historical Resources on May 20, 2002.

History

Richardson log cabin

In 1903, George H. Richardson, an attorney from Alameda, California, built a log cabin vacation home in a grove of pine and eucalyptus trees and on Monte Verde Street between 5th and 4th Avenues in Carmel-by-the-Sea, California. It was one of only a few log houses in early Carmel. In 1914, Robinson Jeffers and his wife Una, rented it as their first home in Carmel after being married in 1913. While living at this cabin, Jeffers wrote and published, with The Macmillan Company, his second book of poetry named Californians.

The structure is a small  one-story, log cabin, L-shaped residence on a raised log base, on a  lot. Exterior walls have hand-hewn logs that are saddle-notched at each end, mortared with cement. The western facing side has a flight of stone and split-log stairs, with a handrail that led to the open porch and entrance to the home. The wood-blank door is set back from the porch. The front gable roof with wood shingles extends over the entry. There is a large eave-wall brick chimney that is stuccoed over. Multi-paned wood casement windows are visible on the west side of the front. Alterations to the cabin were made by various owners. They include a large glass skylight to the living room done in the 1960s, permitted repairs in 1971 by Walter Tancill, and the porch was replaced in the 1990s. Both the wooden stairs and porch have collapsed. The log cabin is deteriorated and is uninhabitable; 75% of the log cabin has been damaged by termites, beetles, and fungus.

On April 19, 1940, Unna Jeffers wrote a column in the Carmel Pine Cone, about their earliest years at the Richardson log cabin: 

In 1914, Una wrote to Edward G. Kuster's wife Edith, telling her how excited she and Jeffers were about Carmel and invited Edith to visit them. Edith wrote: 

After Jeffers had lived less than one year in the Richardson Log Cabin, Jeffers’s father, Reverend Dr. William Hamilton, passed away. He had created a trust that provided an income of $200 a month for his widow, and their two sons.

Richardson eventually moved back to the cabin with his wife. He became a violinist where he entertained other musicians in his home. He died in April 1926 at his cabin after a long illness.

Trethaway cottage

In 1917, Jeffers and his family rented a second wood frame house after the birth of their twins Donnan and Garth. This home was built for Adelaide J. Trethaway in 1914. It had view of Carmel Point.

In 1919, Jeffers bought land at Carmel Point, off Scenic Road that was one of the family’s favorite picnic spots. In mid-May they contracted Mike Murphy to build them a stone cottage at Carmel Point, that would become Tor House and Hawk Tower.

Historic evaluation
The building has been nominated by the Carmel City Council and submitted to the California Register of Historical Resources (DPR 523 Form) on May 20, 2002, by Kent L. Seavey. The property is significant under the California Register criterion 2, as the earliest known Carmel residence of poet Robinson Jeffers; and criterion 3, as one of the earliest residential  houses in Carmel and one of the few log cabins remaining. Jeffers worked at his poetry and completed and published the Californians in 1916, while living at the cabin. It is possible that drawings could be made from the cabin, then torn down and rebuilt with similar logs and materials in compliance with the Secretary of the Interior's standards for the treatment of historic properties.

On May 21, 2018, the city of Carmel-by-the-Sea Historic Resources Board met at Carmel City Hall to discuss the historic evaluation of the Richardson log cabin. In addition, the current owners, John & Carrie Simpson, are in the process of selling the property and hired a historian, Anthony Kirk, Ph.D, to conduct a separate survey of the property, which was recorded on May 3, 2018 with the Department of Parks and Recreation (DPR 523 Form).

See also
 List of Historic Buildings in Carmel-by-the-Sea
 Timeline of Carmel-by-the-Sea, California

References

External links

 Richardson Log Cabin
 The Secretary of the Interior’s Standards for the Treatment of Historic Properties

1903 establishments in California
Carmel-by-the-Sea, California
Buildings and structures in Monterey County, California